The Druesberg (or Drusberg) is a mountain located north of Pragel Pass in the Schwyzer Alps and the canton of Schwyz. It lies on the range between Unteriberg and Muotathal.

The skiing and hiking area Hoch-Ybrig lies to the north-west of the mountain summit, on the slopes into the valleys of the Minster and Waag rivers. To the north-east, the mountain is drained by the upper reaches of the Sihl, which eventually flows the centre of the city of Zürich.

References

External links

Druesberg on SummitPost
Druesberg on outdooractive.com
Druesberg on Hikr

Mountains of Switzerland
Mountains of the Alps
Mountains of the canton of Schwyz